The Donaldson Smith's sparrow-weaver (Plocepasser donaldsoni) is a species of bird in the family Ploceidae. It is found in Africa from southern Ethiopia to central Kenya and southern Somalia.

References

External links
 Donaldson-Smith's sparrow-weaver -  Species text in Weaver Watch.

Plocepasser
Taxonomy articles created by Polbot